Philip Harris (born 1965) won 1st place in the National Portrait Gallery's 1993 BP Portrait Award for portrait painting with the painting 'Two Figures Lying in a Shallow Stream'. Harris was commissioned by the National Portrait Gallery to paint Sir Anthony Dowell, the Director of the Royal Ballet.

He specialises in realistic figurative painting and portraiture in oils or pencil drawing.

References

External links
National Portrait Gallery collection - Sir Anthony Dowell, by Philip Harris
homepage - www.philip-harris.com
articles and media references

1965 births
Living people
British portrait painters
BP Portrait Award winners
English contemporary artists